Hervé de Luze (born 1949) is a French film editor with about fifty feature film credits.

de Luze had a long collaboration with the director Claude Berri, for whom he edited eight films between 1981 and 1999. de Luze has been director Roman Polanski's principal editor since Pirates (1986), including the much honored 2002 film The Pianist. de Luze has also edited several films with Alain Resnais, including On connaît la chanson, for which he won a César Award.

de Luze was nominated for the Academy Award for Best Film Editing for The Pianist. de Luze has also won three César Awards (the "French Academy Award") for On connaît la chanson (1997), for Ne le dis à personne (2006), and for The Ghost Writer (2010); he has been nominated for the César for five other films as well.

Filmography
The listing is based on the Internet Movie Database; the directors for several films are given in parenthesis.

See also
List of film director and editor collaborations. de Luze's collaboration with Roman Polanski extends from 1986 to the present.

References

External links

1949 births
Living people
French film editors
César Award winners
Date of birth missing (living people)
Place of birth missing (living people)
Knights of the Ordre national du Mérite